The 2015 season was Jeonbuk Hyundai Motors' twenty-first season in the K League Classic in South Korea. Jeonbuk Hyundai Motors also competed in the Korean FA Cup and AFC Champions League.

Current squad 
As of 5 January 2015

Out on loan

Transfer

In

Out

Coaching staff

Match results

Training camp 
Training camp location: Dubai, United Arab Emirates

K-League Classic
All times are Korea Standard Time (KST) – UTC+9

Results by round

Korean FA Cup

AFC Champions League

Group stage

Squad statistics

Top 10 Scorers

Top 10 Assists

References 

Jeonbuk Hyundai Motors
2015